Teeradon Supapunpinyo (born 27 April 1997), also known by his nickname James, is a Thai actor, singer, and model. He became known for his role in the GTH television series Hormones, and has starred in the films Bad Genius (2017) and Homestay (2018).

Early life and education
Teeradon was born on 27 April 1997 in Bangkok, Thailand.

He graduated school from Suankularb Wittayalai School, and attained a bachelor's degree from the Faculty of Journalism and Mass Communication, Thammasat University.

Career
Teeradon began his acting career in 2014 through Hormones: The Next Gen, a talent-searching and reality TV programme produced by Nadao Bangkok (a subsidiary of GTH), which cast actors for the second and third seasons of the main Hormones series, which had been a hit the previous year. Teeradon first appeared in the series' second season as the supporting character Sun, and reprised the role as a main character in the third season. He appeared in several other TV productions by GTH and its affiliates, including the horror anthology ThirTEEN Terrors and the mini-series Stay: Saga.. Love Always in 2015, the Promlikit (Destiny) segment of the 2016 series Love Songs Love Series and its sequel in 2017.

He had his first film role in the 2017 hit Bad Genius, in which he played the character Pat. He portrayed a teenager with major depressive order in the 2017 TV series Project S, and had his first lead role in the 2018 film Homestay.

From 2018 to 2019, he performed as part of the idol group Nine by Nine, a one-year project initiated by 4Nologue. As a member of the group, he appeared in the 2018 TV series In Family We Trust and played the lead role in the 2019 series Great Men Academy. He did not renew his contract with Nadao Bangkok when it ended in 2019, opting instead to pursue singing/performing under 4nologue as part of its four-member boy band Trinity. Teeradon also appeared in the ninth season of the TV show  The Mask Singer.

On 20 August 2021, Teeradon announced his departure from Trinity. He will continue his career as an artist and an actor outside of the agency.

He starred in the movie Thirteen Lives as Ekkaphon Chanthawong (Eak), the coach of the junior football team that got trapped and rescued in a cave in 2018. The production was held in Australia, with additional scenes shot in Thailand.

Filmography

Films

Television series

References

External links
 
 

1997 births
Living people
Teeradon Supapunpinyo
Teeradon Supapunpinyo
Teeradon Supapunpinyo
Teeradon Supapunpinyo